Castello Piccolomini may refer to several castles in the Province of L'Aquila, Italy:
 Castello Piccolomini (Balsorano)
 Castello Piccolomini (Capestrano)
 Castello Piccolomini (Celano)
 Castello Piccolomini (Ortucchio)